The Debt is a 1993 short film by Bruno de Almeida.

A Portuguese–American dark comedy, The Debt is a short film set against the backdrop of the early 1990s recession in the United States, and concerns a "yuppie couple" in crisis who are approached by a door-to-door salesman and his book about optimism.

Produced and directed by Bruno de Almeida, written by Steven Ausbury, and scored by Frank London, with Jean de Segonzac as cinematographer.  It stars Kristen Johnston, Paul Lazar, and Scott Renderer.  The Debt is in English and twelve minutes long.

References

External links
 

1990s English-language films
1993 short films
American short films
films directed by Bruno de Almeida
Portuguese short films